The Ministry of Francophone Affairs in the Canadian province of Ontario is responsible for the provision of government services to Franco-Ontarian citizens and communities. 

It was originally founded as the Office of Francophone Affairs in 1986 by the government of David Peterson, as an expansion of the former Office of the Government Coordinator of French-Language Services. It was upgraded to a full ministry in 2017 by the government of Kathleen Wynne. 

Following the 2018 Ontario general election, the new government of Doug Ford announced plans to demote the department from a ministry back down to an office, but was forced to backtrack in the face of community opposition. 

Under the province's French Language Services Act, the provincial government provides French language services if a community or region's francophone population exceeds 5,000 or 10 percent of the community's total population. There are 25 areas of the province so designated. The office also has a role in the governance of Ontario's francophone public television network, TFO, as well as francophone school boards and other government offices, and acts as a liaison office between the government and other francophone cultural agencies and social services.

The current Minister of Francophone Affairs is Caroline Mulroney.

Ministry Agencies 

 Provincial Advisory Committee on Francophone Affairs 
 Special Advisor on Francophone Affairs 
 Special Advisor on Francophone Economic Development

Ministers
Bernard Grandmaître (1986-1989)
Charles Beer (1989-1990)
Gilles Pouliot (1990-1995)
Noble Villeneuve (1995-1999)
John Baird (1999-2003)
Madeleine Meilleur (2003-2016)
Marie-France Lalonde (2016-2018)
Caroline Mulroney (2018-present)

References

External links
 

Francophone Affairs
Franco-Ontarian organizations
Bilingualism in Canada
1986 establishments in Ontario
Franco-Ontarian history